Vijibweni is an administrative ward in the Kigamboni district of the Dar es Salaam Region of Tanzania. In 2016 the Tanzania National Bureau of Statistics report there were 36,327 people in the ward, from 29,010 in 2012.

References

Temeke District
Wards of Dar es Salaam Region